The 2020 Nürburgring Langstrecken Serie was the 43rd season of the German endurance series (formerly VLN) run at the Nürburgring Nordschleife, and first run as the Nürburgring Langstrecken Serie (NLS). The season began on 27 June and ended prematurely on 29 August.

Calendar

Classes
Entries are split into multiple different classes. Current classes are:

Entry Lists

SP9 / SPX

SP7

SP8

SP8T

SP10

TCR

Other classes

Results
Results indicates overall winner only in the whole race.

Championship standings

{|
| valign="top" |

References

External links
 
 

2020 in German motorsport
Nürburgring Endurance Series seasons
NLS Series